Victor Charles Matthews (born 23 June 1934) is a British hurdler and decathlete. He competed in the men's 110 metres hurdles at the 1960 Summer Olympics.

He also represented England in the 120 yards hurdles at the 1958 British Empire and Commonwealth Games in Cardiff, Wales. He was the 1956 National decathlon champion.

References

1934 births
Living people
Athletes (track and field) at the 1960 Summer Olympics
British male hurdlers
Olympic athletes of Great Britain
Place of birth missing (living people)
Athletes (track and field) at the 1958 British Empire and Commonwealth Games
Commonwealth Games competitors for England